Politotdel is a rural locality (a selo) in Shestayevsky Selsoviet, Davlekanovsky District, Bashkortostan, Russia. The population was 191 as of 2010. There are 4 streets.

Geography 
Politotdel is located 26 km north of Davlekanovo (the district's administrative centre) by road. Shestayevo is the nearest rural locality.

References 

Rural localities in Davlekanovsky District